Stebno is a municipality and village in Ústí nad Labem District in the Ústí nad Labem Region of the Czech Republic. It has about 500 inhabitants.

Administrative parts
Villages of Chvalov, Milbohov, Podlešín and Suchá are administrative parts of Stebno.

References

Villages in Ústí nad Labem District